Guomao Station is an interchange station on Line 1 and Line 10 of the Beijing Subway at the China World Trade Center. Guomao is the Chinese abbreviation for China World Trade Center. It is located in Chaoyang District. The station handled a peak passenger traffic of 359,800 people on May 5, 2013.

Station layout 
Both the line 1 and line 10 stations have underground island platforms. Line 10 has a split island platform, whilst line 1 has a normal island platform. The existing 8.5 meter wide transfer channel connecting the two platforms is insufficient to handle the large interchange volumes between the two busy lines. Daily transfer volumes typically reach 140,000 every weekday, peaking at 32,000 transfers in the AM peak period. During rush hours about 10,000 passengers per hour transfer between the two lines in each direction. The Beijing government is proposing the transfer channel be rebuilt into a large transfer hall to improve passenger circulation.

Exits 
There are eight exits, lettered A, B, C, D, E1, E2, F, and G. Exits D, E1, and E2 are accessible.

Gallery

References

External links

 Satellite picture on Google Maps

Beijing Subway stations in Chaoyang District
Railway stations in China opened in 1999